Vaun Jon O'Callaghan is a New Zealand rugby league player who represented New Zealand in 1985.

Playing career
O'Callaghan played for Huntly South in the Waikato Rugby League competition and was a Waikato representative. He was selected for the New Zealand national rugby league team in 1985. O'Callaghan however did not play in any Test matches for New Zealand.

In 1989 O'Callaghan played for the Otahuhu Leopards in the Auckland Rugby League competition and represented Auckland.

References

Living people
New Zealand rugby league players
New Zealand national rugby league team players
Waikato rugby league team players
Auckland rugby league team players
Otahuhu Leopards players
Rugby league fullbacks
Year of birth missing (living people)